The 1918 Svenska Mästerskapet Final was played on 6 October 1918 between the three-time finalists IFK Göteborg and the first-time finalists Helsingborgs IF. The match decided the winner of 1918 Svenska Mästerskapet, the football cup to determine the Swedish champions. IFK Göteborg won their third title with a 5–0 victory.

Route to the final

IFK Göteborg 

IFK Göteborg entered in the preliminary round and won, 5–3, against GAIS on 21 August 1918 at home in Gothenburg. On 1 September 1918, IFK Göteborg won the quarter-final against Örgryte IS at home, 2–0. The semi-final against IK Sirius was played at home on 22 September 1918, and ended in a 6–1 win.

IFK Göteborg made their third appearance in a Svenska Mästerskapet final, having won their previous two.

Helsingborgs IF 

Helsingborgs IF entered in the preliminary round against IFK Malmö and won 4–1 on 18 August 1918 at home in Helsingborg. On, 1 September 1918, Helsingborgs IF won the away-game quarter-final against IFK Norrköping in Norrköping, 3–1. The away-game semi-final against Mariebergs IK was played in Stockholm on 22 September 1918 and resulted in a Helsingborg win, 2–1.

Helsingborgs IF made their second appearance in a Svenska Mästerskapet final, having lost their previous in 1914 .

Match details

References 

Print

1918
1918 in Swedish football
IFK Göteborg matches
October 1918 sports events
Helsingborgs IF matches